The 1924 VFL season was the 28th season of the Victorian Football League (VFL), the highest level senior Australian rules football competition in Victoria. The season featured nine clubs, ran from 26 April until 27 September, and comprised a 16-game home-and-away season followed by a finals series featuring the top four clubs.

The premiership was won by the Essendon Football Club for the sixth time and second time consecutively, after it won the round-robin finals series which was held in this season only. It is the last time a VFL/AFL premiership was not decided by a grand final.

The season saw the first presentation of the Brownlow Medal for fairest and best player in the league, won by Edward Greeves.

Premiership season
In 1924, the VFL competition consisted of nine teams of 18 on-the-field players each, with no reserves, although any of the 18 players who had left the playing field for any reason could later resume their place on the field at any time during the match.

Each team played each other twice in a home-and-away season of 18 rounds (i.e., 16 matches and 2 byes).

Once the 18 round home-and-away season had finished, the 1924 VFL premiership was determined by an experimental 1924 finals system, which the VFL used in this season only. The format was similar to the round-robin format used in 1897 Finals System, but included the minor premier's right to challenge, which existed under the amended Argus System.

Round 1

|- style="background:#ccf;"
| Home team
| Home team score
| Away team
| Away team score
| Venue
| Crowd
| Date
|- style="background:#fff;"
| 
| 10.7 (67)
| 
| 13.16 (94)
| Punt Road Oval
| 20,000
| 26 April 1924
|- style="background:#fff;"
| 
| 12.12 (84)
| 
| 11.16 (82)
| Junction Oval
| 15,000
| 26 April 1924
|- style="background:#fff;"
| 
| 8.15 (63)
| 
| 12.7 (79)
| Windy Hill
| 25,000
| 26 April 1924
|- style="background:#fff;"
| 
| 16.9 (105)
| 
| 15.13 (103)
| Brunswick Street Oval
| 30,000
| 26 April 1924

Round 2

|- style="background:#ccf;"
| Home team
| Home team score
| Away team
| Away team score
| Venue
| Crowd
| Date
|- style="background:#fff;"
| 
| 10.15 (75)
| 
| 7.11 (53)
| Corio Oval
| 13,000
| 3 May 1924
|- style="background:#fff;"
| 
| 10.17 (77)
| 
| 7.15 (57)
| Victoria Park
| 19,000
| 3 May 1924
|- style="background:#fff;"
| 
| 7.14 (56)
| 
| 7.14 (56)
| Princes Park
| 40,000
| 3 May 1924
|- style="background:#fff;"
| 
| 7.15 (57)
| 
| 12.14 (86)
| Lake Oval
| 28,000
| 3 May 1924

Round 3

|- style="background:#ccf;"
| Home team
| Home team score
| Away team
| Away team score
| Venue
| Crowd
| Date
|- style="background:#fff;"
| 
| 14.13 (97)
| 
| 10.14 (74)
| Brunswick Street Oval
| 20,000
| 10 May 1924
|- style="background:#fff;"
| 
| 12.13 (85)
| 
| 8.11 (59)
| Windy Hill
| 25,000
| 10 May 1924
|- style="background:#fff;"
| 
| 8.13 (61)
| 
| 8.14 (62)
| MCG
| 18,211
| 10 May 1924
|- style="background:#fff;"
| 
| 9.22 (76)
| 
| 13.12 (90)
| Junction Oval
| 26,000
| 10 May 1924

Round 4

|- style="background:#ccf;"
| Home team
| Home team score
| Away team
| Away team score
| Venue
| Crowd
| Date
|- style="background:#fff;"
| 
| 11.10 (76)
| 
| 14.25 (109)
| Princes Park
| 23,000
| 17 May 1924
|- style="background:#fff;"
| 
| 12.9 (81)
| 
| 7.11 (53)
| Lake Oval
| 22,000
| 17 May 1924
|- style="background:#fff;"
| 
| 5.18 (48)
| 
| 10.14 (74)
| Punt Road Oval
| 22,000
| 17 May 1924
|- style="background:#fff;"
| 
| 8.12 (60)
| 
| 12.8 (80)
| Corio Oval
| 12,000
| 17 May 1924

Round 5

|- style="background:#ccf;"
| Home team
| Home team score
| Away team
| Away team score
| Venue
| Crowd
| Date
|- style="background:#fff;"
| 
| 10.16 (76)
| 
| 10.9 (69)
| MCG
| 22,072
| 24 May 1924
|- style="background:#fff;"
| 
| 13.16 (94)
| 
| 3.13 (31)
| Windy Hill
| 22,000
| 24 May 1924
|- style="background:#fff;"
| 
| 13.24 (102)
| 
| 11.10 (76)
| Junction Oval
| 16,000
| 24 May 1924
|- style="background:#fff;"
| 
| 19.17 (131)
| 
| 16.11 (107)
| Victoria Park
| 25,000
| 24 May 1924

Round 6

|- style="background:#ccf;"
| Home team
| Home team score
| Away team
| Away team score
| Venue
| Crowd
| Date
|- style="background:#fff;"
| 
| 9.19 (73)
| 
| 8.6 (54)
| Punt Road Oval
| 20,000
| 31 May 1924
|- style="background:#fff;"
| 
| 9.19 (73)
| 
| 9.9 (63)
| Corio Oval
| 12,000
| 31 May 1924
|- style="background:#fff;"
| 
| 10.8 (68)
| 
| 8.13 (61)
| Brunswick Street Oval
| 35,000
| 31 May 1924
|- style="background:#fff;"
| 
| 9.15 (69)
| 
| 8.8 (56)
| Lake Oval
| 25,000
| 31 May 1924

Round 7

|- style="background:#ccf;"
| Home team
| Home team score
| Away team
| Away team score
| Venue
| Crowd
| Date
|- style="background:#fff;"
| 
| 10.16 (76)
| 
| 11.16 (82)
| Victoria Park
| 14,000
| 7 June 1924
|- style="background:#fff;"
| 
| 10.12 (72)
| 
| 11.12 (78)
| Princes Park
| 29,000
| 7 June 1924
|- style="background:#fff;"
| 
| 11.17 (83)
| 
| 13.9 (87)
| MCG
| 27,533
| 9 June 1924
|- style="background:#fff;"
| 
| 12.13 (85)
| 
| 14.9 (93)
| Junction Oval
| 30,000
| 9 June 1924

Round 8

|- style="background:#ccf;"
| Home team
| Home team score
| Away team
| Away team score
| Venue
| Crowd
| Date
|- style="background:#fff;"
| 
| 12.15 (87)
| 
| 5.11 (41)
| Brunswick Street Oval
| 15,000
| 14 June 1924
|- style="background:#fff;"
| 
| 16.17 (113)
| 
| 3.13 (31)
| Windy Hill
| 20,000
| 14 June 1924
|- style="background:#fff;"
| 
| 12.23 (95)
| 
| 10.10 (70)
| Punt Road Oval
| 21,000
| 14 June 1924
|- style="background:#fff;"
| 
| 9.12 (66)
| 
| 6.15 (51)
| Corio Oval
| 12,000
| 14 June 1924

Round 9

|- style="background:#ccf;"
| Home team
| Home team score
| Away team
| Away team score
| Venue
| Crowd
| Date
|- style="background:#fff;"
| 
| 7.9 (51)
| 
| 9.14 (68)
| Victoria Park
| 22,000
| 21 June 1924
|- style="background:#fff;"
| 
| 3.10 (28)
| 
| 5.8 (38)
| Princes Park
| 21,000
| 21 June 1924
|- style="background:#fff;"
| 
| 7.6 (48)
| 
| 7.3 (45)
| Lake Oval
| 20,000
| 21 June 1924
|- style="background:#fff;"
| 
| 5.12 (42)
| 
| 10.11 (71)
| MCG
| 18,769
| 21 June 1924

Round 10

|- style="background:#ccf;"
| Home team
| Home team score
| Away team
| Away team score
| Venue
| Crowd
| Date
|- style="background:#fff;"
| 
| 8.15 (63)
| 
| 6.15 (51)
| MCG
| 14,286
| 28 June 1924
|- style="background:#fff;"
| 
| 4.10 (34)
| 
| 8.12 (60)
| Victoria Park
| 20,000
| 28 June 1924
|- style="background:#fff;"
| 
| 15.14 (104)
| 
| 8.8 (56)
| Princes Park
| 27,770
| 28 June 1924
|- style="background:#fff;"
| 
| 9.7 (61)
| 
| 5.13 (43)
| Lake Oval
| 30,000
| 28 June 1924

Round 11

|- style="background:#ccf;"
| Home team
| Home team score
| Away team
| Away team score
| Venue
| Crowd
| Date
|- style="background:#fff;"
| 
| 4.17 (41)
| 
| 9.10 (64)
| Brunswick Street Oval
| 20,000
| 5 July 1924
|- style="background:#fff;"
| 
| 10.20 (80)
| 
| 9.8 (62)
| Punt Road Oval
| 18,000
| 5 July 1924
|- style="background:#fff;"
| 
| 16.16 (112)
| 
| 6.16 (52)
| Junction Oval
| 13,000
| 5 July 1924
|- style="background:#fff;"
| 
| 10.19 (79)
| 
| 8.14 (62)
| Windy Hill
| 28,000
| 5 July 1924

Round 12

|- style="background:#ccf;"
| Home team
| Home team score
| Away team
| Away team score
| Venue
| Crowd
| Date
|- style="background:#fff;"
| 
| 11.10 (76)
| 
| 7.11 (53)
| Victoria Park
| 8,000
| 12 July 1924
|- style="background:#fff;"
| 
| 14.15 (99)
| 
| 8.8 (56)
| Princes Park
| 17,000
| 12 July 1924
|- style="background:#fff;"
| 
| 9.14 (68)
| 
| 9.11 (65)
| Corio Oval
| 15,000
| 12 July 1924
|- style="background:#fff;"
| 
| 9.8 (62)
| 
| 6.13 (49)
| Lake Oval
| 33,000
| 12 July 1924

Round 13

|- style="background:#ccf;"
| Home team
| Home team score
| Away team
| Away team score
| Venue
| Crowd
| Date
|- style="background:#fff;"
| 
| 13.14 (92)
| 
| 12.16 (88)
| Junction Oval
| 25,000
| 19 July 1924
|- style="background:#fff;"
| 
| 7.12 (54)
| 
| 8.16 (64)
| Brunswick Street Oval
| 26,000
| 19 July 1924
|- style="background:#fff;"
| 
| 10.14 (74)
| 
| 8.14 (62)
| Windy Hill
| 20,000
| 19 July 1924
|- style="background:#fff;"
| 
| 7.13 (55)
| 
| 9.8 (62)
| MCG
| 17,931
| 19 July 1924

Round 14

|- style="background:#ccf;"
| Home team
| Home team score
| Away team
| Away team score
| Venue
| Crowd
| Date
|- style="background:#fff;"
| 
| 18.15 (123)
| 
| 7.6 (48)
| Corio Oval
| 12,000
| 26 July 1924
|- style="background:#fff;"
| 
| 10.12 (72)
| 
| 12.12 (84)
| Princes Park
| 30,000
| 26 July 1924
|- style="background:#fff;"
| 
| 12.13 (85)
| 
| 5.8 (38)
| Lake Oval
| 16,000
| 26 July 1924
|- style="background:#fff;"
| 
| 7.14 (56)
| 
| 12.13 (85)
| Punt Road Oval
| 38,000
| 26 July 1924

Round 15

|- style="background:#ccf;"
| Home team
| Home team score
| Away team
| Away team score
| Venue
| Crowd
| Date
|- style="background:#fff;"
| 
| 9.19 (73)
| 
| 9.7 (61)
| Windy Hill
| 26,000
| 2 August 1924
|- style="background:#fff;"
| 
| 9.16 (70)
| 
| 6.15 (51)
| Victoria Park
| 18,000
| 2 August 1924
|- style="background:#fff;"
| 
| 5.9 (39)
| 
| 11.12 (78)
| Junction Oval
| 10,000
| 2 August 1924
|- style="background:#fff;"
| 
| 5.9 (39)
| 
| 8.8 (56)
| MCG
| 7,382
| 2 August 1924

Round 16

|- style="background:#ccf;"
| Home team
| Home team score
| Away team
| Away team score
| Venue
| Crowd
| Date
|- style="background:#fff;"
| 
| 16.13 (109)
| 
| 6.10 (46)
| Brunswick Street Oval
| 10,000
| 23 August 1924
|- style="background:#fff;"
| 
| 17.19 (121)
| 
| 9.21 (75)
| Punt Road Oval
| 14,000
| 23 August 1924
|- style="background:#fff;"
| 
| 9.19 (73)
| 
| 5.6 (36)
| Corio Oval
| 15,600
| 23 August 1924
|- style="background:#fff;"
| 
| 13.19 (97)
| 
| 4.7 (31)
| Lake Oval
| 22,000
| 23 August 1924

Round 17

|- style="background:#ccf;"
| Home team
| Home team score
| Away team
| Away team score
| Venue
| Crowd
| Date
|- style="background:#fff;"
| 
| 6.13 (49)
| 
| 8.13 (61)
| Victoria Park
| 21,000
| 30 August 1924
|- style="background:#fff;"
| 
| 9.7 (61)
| 
| 6.18 (54)
| Princes Park
| 15,000
| 30 August 1924
|- style="background:#fff;"
| 
| 9.13 (67)
| 
| 16.14 (110)
| MCG
| 12,487
| 30 August 1924
|- style="background:#fff;"
| 
| 9.5 (59)
| 
| 11.17 (83)
| Junction Oval
| 20,000
| 30 August 1924

Round 18

|- style="background:#ccf;"
| Home team
| Home team score
| Away team
| Away team score
| Venue
| Crowd
| Date
|- style="background:#fff;"
| 
| 9.13 (67)
| 
| 9.14 (68)
| Corio Oval
| 16,500
| 6 September 1924
|- style="background:#fff;"
| 
| 12.10 (82)
| 
| 14.12 (96)
| Windy Hill
| 10,000
| 6 September 1924
|- style="background:#fff;"
| 
| 6.14 (50)
| 
| 11.20 (86)
| Brunswick Street Oval
| 13,000
| 6 September 1924
|- style="background:#fff;"
| 
| 12.16 (88)
| 
| 8.12 (60)
| Punt Road Oval
| 30,000
| 6 September 1924

Ladder

1924 finals series
In 1924, the VFL dispensed with the amended Argus system and adopted a new finals system initially proposed by Carlton delegate Reg Hunt. The new scheme saw the top four clubs play a round-robin semi-finals series over three weeks, with two matches played each Saturday. Then, if the minor premiers did not finish on top of the round-robin ladder, a Grand Final would be played between the minor premiers and round-robin winner.

The scheme was developed primarily as a result of demand for entry to finals matches in the early 1920s exceeding the capacity of the Melbourne Cricket Ground. It was noted that while an average of 80,000 spectators attended a four-game home-and-away round, the capacity of the Melbourne Cricket Ground was limited to about 55,000; and, as such, under the Argus system, in which only one final was played each day, many spectators were turned away. However, playing two semi-finals on each day would allow more spectators to attend.

However, even the weeks with higher spectator numbers did not translate to better financial performance: extra competing teams meant more clubs whose members were entitled free admission and fewer neutral spectators paying at the gate. As a result, the new scheme was abandoned at the end of the year and the amended Argus system resumed from 1925.

Semi-finals

Week 1

|- style="background:#ccf;"
| Home team
| Home team score
| Away team
| Away team score
| Venue
| Crowd
| Date
|- style="background:#fff;"
| 
| 8.10 (58)
| 
| 2.6 (18)
| MCG
| 42,522
| 13 September 1924
|- style="background:#fff;"
| 
| 13.7 (85)
| 
| 9.3 (57)
| Windy Hill
| 22,300
| 13 September 1924

Week 2

|- style="background:#ccf;"
| Home team
| Home team score
| Away team
| Away team score
| Venue
| Crowd
| Date
|- style="background:#fff;"
| 
| 11.10 (76)
| 
| 8.8 (56)
| Princes Park
| 26,000
| 20 September 1924
|- style="background:#fff;"
| 
| 10.12 (72)
| 
| 4.15 (39)
| MCG
| 35,407
| 20 September 1924

Week 3

|- style="background:#ccf;"
| Home team
| Home team score
| Away team
| Away team score
| Venue
| Crowd
| Date
|- style="background:#fff;"
| 
| 9.13 (67)
| 
| 6.11 (47)
| Lake Oval
| 25,000
| 27 September 1924
|- style="background:#fff;"
| 
| 13.8 (86)
| 
| 10.13 (73)
| MCG
| 17,503
| 27 September 1924

Finals ladder

Finals team squads
As there was no designated grand final, this also meant that there were no grand final teams in 1924; instead there was an "Essendon finals squad", a "Fitzroy finals squad", a "Richmond finals squad", and a "South Melbourne finals squad".
Listed in alphabetical order the four squads were:
 Essendon squad: Fred Baring, Syd Barker, Sr. (captain), Norm Beckton,  Clyde Donaldson, Charlie Farrell, Tom Fitzmaurice, Jack Garden, Harry Gregory, Charlie Hardy, Harry Hunter, Tommy Jenkins, Roy Laing, Frank Maher, Charlie May, Justin McCarthy, George Rawle, George Shorten, Greg Stockdale, Jimmy Sullivan, and Rowley Watt.
 Fitzroy squad: Bill Adams, Jim Atkinson (captain), Arthur Batchelor, Les Bryant, Charlie Chapman, Goldie Collins, Tommy Corrigan, Arch Dickens, Steve Donnellan, Ern Elliott, Clive Fergie, Jimmy Freake, Len Gale, Tom Hickey, Horrie Jenkin, Gordon McCracken, Stan Molan, Jack Moriarty, Gordon Rattray, Jim Tarbotton, Len Wigraft, and Fred Williams.
 Richmond squad: Jack Barnett, Ted Bourke, Ralph Empey, Clarrie Hall, Joe Harrison, Doug Hayes, Gordon Hislop, Max Hislop, Jim Karthaus, Bob McCaskill, Norm McIntosh, Angus MacIsaac, Keith Millar, Dan Minogue (captain), Mel Morris, Reuben Reid, George Rudolph, James Smith, Jim Spain, Ernie Taylor, Vic Thorp, and George Valentine.
 South Melbourne squad: Harry Alexander, Bobby Allison, Phil Brooks, Martin Brown, Roy Cazaly (captain), Bill Condon, Fred Fleiter, Arthur Hando, Jacky Harris, Ted Johnson, Tom Joyce, Frank Laird, Harold Mahony, Herb Matthews, Bob McDonald, Charles McDonald, Gil Miller, Charlie Nicholls, Jack O'Connell, Ted O'Meara, Frank Ross, Joe Scanlan, Paddy Scanlan, Mark Tandy, and Les Woodfield.

Awards
 The 1924 VFL premiership team was Essendon.
 The VFL's leading goalkicker was Jack Moriarty of Fitzroy with 82 goals, a VFL record. (Moriarty had played 13 senior games for Essendon in 1922, and after playing in Essendon's Second Eighteen for 1923, and was released to Fitzroy).
 The winner of the 1924 (inaugural) Brownlow Medal was Edward "Carji" Greeves of Geelong with 7 votes.
 St Kilda took the wooden spoon in 1924.
 The seconds grand final was scratched and the premiership was awarded to  after minor premiers  refused to travel to Geelong for the grand final.

Notable events
 Administrator Charles Brownlow died on 23 January 1924; the Charles Brownlow Trophy, more commonly known as the Brownlow Medal, was instituted in his memory. The trophy is to be awarded to "the best and fairest player" in the VFL as determined by the votes of the field umpire at the end of each home-and-away match. From 1924 to 1930, there was a single vote cast per match.
The VFL started fixing the schedule from 1924 to ensure that neither  and  nor  and  played home matches on the same day due to the heavy transport and labour burden associated with running the two nearby venues at the same time. This arrangement continued as long as the clubs played at nearby locations.
 Bill Twomey, Sr. who played for Collingwood (1918–1922) and would play for Hawthorn (1933–1934), the father of Collingwood's Bill Twomey, Jr. (1945–1958), Pat Twomey (1947–1949; 1952–1953), and Mick Twomey (1951–1961), and the grandfather of Collingwood's David Twomey (1979–1985) wins the 1924, 130-yard Stawell Gift in 12.1 seconds, off a handicap of 8½ yards.
 The Fitzroy versus Carlton match in the opening round was the first VFL match in which both teams scored 100 points.
 The VFL adopts the convention of home teams wearing black shorts and away teams wearing white shorts.
 Because the 1924 premiership was determined by a round-robin system, Essendon won the premiership despite being beaten by runners-up Richmond 9.13 (67) to 6.11 (47) in the last round-robin match; this is the only time in VFL/AFL history that the premiers lost their last match of the season. Richmond would have needed to win by at least 43 points to challenge Essendon to a grand final.
 Many of the Essendon players were unhappy at the poor performances of some of their teammates in the final round robin match against Richmond, and there were heated arguments and fist-fights in the rooms after the match and after a post-match function later that evening, related to accusations of match fixing and receiving bribes.
 On the Saturday after the VFL grand final, Essendon (in its role as 1924 VFL premiers) was challenged by 1924 VFA premiers, Footscray, to a match in aid of Dame Nellie Melba's Limbless Soldiers' Appeal, purportedly (but not officially) for the championship of Victoria. Footscray unexpectedly defeated Essendon 9.10 (64) to 4.12 (36). Again there were accusations of match fixing, and champion centre half-back Tom Fitzmaurice was so disgusted with many of his teammates having, in his view, deliberately lost the match, he never played again for Essendon.
Essendon again objected, and after the league dismissed their complaint, refused to travel to Geelong. Consequently, the match was scratched and the Seconds premiership was awarded to Geelong.

Notes

References
 Hogan P: The Tigers Of Old, Richmond FC, (Melbourne), 1996. 
 Maplestone, M., Flying Higher: History of the Essendon Football Club 1872–1996, Essendon Football Club, (Melbourne), 1996. 
 Rogers, S. & Brown, A., Every Game Ever Played: VFL/AFL Results 1897–1997 (Sixth Edition), Viking Books, (Ringwood), 1998. 
 Ross, J. (ed), 100 Years of Australian Football 1897–1996: The Complete Story of the AFL, All the Big Stories, All the Great Pictures, All the Champions, Every AFL Season Reported, Viking, (Ringwood), 1996.

External links
 1924 Season - AFL Tables
 1924 VFL Premiers vs VFA Premiers Match – BoylesFootballPhotos
 Frost, L., "Did the 1924 Bombers throw their last game?", (25 September, 2006), AFL Official Website

Australian Football League seasons
VFL season